Ricky John Shabong (born 29 December 2002) is an Indian professional footballer who plays as a midfielder for Indian Super League club ATK Mohun Bagan.

Career
From Royal Wahingdoh FC, he has selected to the Indian national U-14 team in 2016. He was part of the Indian U-16 team that reached the quarterfinals of the 2018 AFC U-16 Championship in Malaysia. The midfielder was in the starting XI of each one of India's four matches. 
 
Ricky made his professional debut for the side in the Arrow's first match of the 2019–20 season against Gokulam Kerala F.C. He started and played full match as Indian Arrows lost 0–1.

Career statistics

Club

Honours

India U-20
OFC Youth Development Tournament: 2019

References

2002 births
Living people
People from Shillong
Indian footballers
Indian Arrows players
Footballers from Meghalaya
I-League players
India youth international footballers
Association football midfielders
Rajasthan United FC players